Lisa Chambers (born 24 August 1986) is an Irish Fianna Fáil politician, and former barrister who has served as Leader of the Seanad since December 2022. She served as deputy leader of the Seanad from 2020 to 2022, and as Leader of Fianna Fáil in the Seanad since June 2020. She previously served as a Teachta Dála (TD) for the Mayo constituency from 2016 to 2020.

Early life
Chambers is from Castlebar. She practised as a barrister, running her own practice in the town. She holds a professional bar qualification from the King's Inns, a Masters in Commercial Law from University College, Dublin (UCD), and a graduate degree in Commerce and Law from NUI Galway (NUIG).

She was an unsuccessful candidate at the 2011 general election for the Mayo constituency. She was elected to Mayo County Council following the 2014 local elections.

Chambers was a member of the Reserve Defence Forces (RDF) for 13 years, having joined as a teenager during secondary school. She was commissioned as an officer in the Army Reserve in November 2012, serving as a second lieutenant with the 1st Armoured Cavalry Squadron (Curragh Camp), shortly after she transferred to the D Company (Castlebar), 6th Infantry Battalion, but resigned her commission when elected to the Dáil.

Political career

TD (2016–2020)
Following the 2016 general election, she was elected as a Fianna Fáil TD for the Mayo constituency. She is not related to fellow Fianna Fáil politicians Frank Chambers or Jack Chambers.

She was appointed Spokesperson on Defence in the Fianna Fáil Front Bench on 18 May 2016, succeeding Seán Ó Fearghaíl who had been elected Ceann Comhairle of the 32nd Dáil. She was later given the Brexit portfolio in a reshuffle. 

She lost her seat at the 2020 general election after 4 years in the Dáil.

In an extended podcast interview with Sean O'Rourke as part of the RTE TV series Two Tribes, aside from a national trend towards Sinn Fein and a poor Fianna Fail national campaign she attributed her election failure to her position on the 8th Amendment "in what is predominantly a conservative constituency particularly among Fianna Fail voters".

Senator (2020–present)
At the 2020 Seanad election, Chambers was elected as a Senator for the Cultural and Educational Panel. She is Fianna Fáil spokesperson on Foreign and European Affairs in the Seanad.

Chambers also chairs the Seanad Special Select Committee on the Withdrawal of the United Kingdom from the European Union.

Controversies
On 29 November 2018 in a Dáil debate on Health (Regulation of Termination of Pregnancy) Bill 2018, Chambers stated "Abortion regret is made up and it does not exist". A number of days later she apologised to hurt she caused and stating her comments were taken out of context. 

On 17 October 2019 Chambers became embroiled in a voting controversy, she was shown in to have voted on behalf of party colleague Dara Calleary and herself during a vote on an amendment on a forestry motion.

In December, the Sunday Independent discovered footage from 17th January 2019 that appeared to show Chambers sitting in Timmy Dooley's seat for fifty minutes while seven votes were recorded, although not visible in the footage, votes were also recorded from Chambers' seat. 

She was one of a number of TDs found to be claiming a €25-per-day expense for phone roaming charges while travelling in the EU, two years after mobile phone roaming charges were abolished in the region. She claimed a total of €525 for ‘daily telephone allowance’ while travelling in the EU. In February 2020, Chambers defended choosing a route to the Oireachtas that is 35km longer than the shortest possible journey, placing her in the "band 9" of the travel allowance table increasing her annual allowance by €1,350. Several months later, Chambers was found to have received expenses of €6,626 for April and May 2020 during which time the Seanad was closed due to COVID-19 pandemic.

References

External links
Lisa Chambers' page on the Fianna Fáil website

1986 births
21st-century women Teachtaí Dála
21st-century women members of Seanad Éireann
Alumni of King's Inns
Alumni of the University of Galway
Alumni of University College Dublin
Fianna Fáil TDs
Fianna Fáil senators
Irish barristers
Living people
Local councillors in County Mayo
Members of the 26th Seanad
Members of the 32nd Dáil
Military personnel from County Mayo
People from Castlebar
Politicians from County Mayo